Bulo may refer to:

People
 Bulo C Rani (1920–1993), Indian music director
 Jorgo Bulo (1939–2015), Albanian philologist, historian, and literary critic

Places
 , a village in the former municipality Qendër Libohovë
 Bulo, Uganda
 Bulo Bulo, Bolivia